North Davidson High School (commonly referred to as "NDHS," or simply "North") is a public high school in Welcome, North Carolina (near Lexington). It was established in 1952 and is located along Old US Highway 52 in northern Davidson County. The high school serves the Welcome, Arcadia and Midway areas.

Feeder schools
Friedburg Elementary 
Midway Elementary 
Northwest Elementary 
Welcome Elementary 
North Davidson Middle

Athletics
The school's mascot is the Black Knight, although female athletic teams often use the term "Lady Knights".

NDHS is a member of the Mid Piedmont 3-A Conference. Their biggest rivals are Central Davidson, and Lexington Senior High in Lexington, North Carolina, and Ledford High in Thomasville, North Carolina.

The school's athletics logo is an interlocking "ND" in orange, black, and white colors. It is copied from the University of Notre Dame athletics logo. Other NDHS logos feature black knights riding upon a horse in armor.

North Davidson offers the following sports:
Baseball
Basketball
Cross Country
Cheerleading
Football
Golf
Lacrosse
Soccer
Softball
Swimming
Tennis
Track
Volleyball
Wrestling

Notable alumni
Austin Beck, professional baseball player for the Stockton Ports, 6th overall pick in the 2017 Major League Baseball draft
Jim Bretz, baseball scout and former college baseball coach
Christopher Dunn (American football), 2022 Lou Groza Award winner at NC State
Nia Franklin, Miss America 2019
Griff Garrison, professional Wrestler for All Elite Wrestling
Trey Hutchens, professional stock car racing driver
Debbie Leonard, former Duke University Women's Basketball coach and television commentator
David Mathis, PGA Tour golfer
Levi Michael, professional baseball player
Perry Tuttle, former NFL and CFL wide receiver
Shy Tuttle, NFL defensive tackle for the Carolina Panthers
Bryce Williams, NFL and AAF tight end

References

External links
 

Schools in Davidson County, North Carolina
Public high schools in North Carolina
Educational institutions established in 1952
1952 establishments in North Carolina